Sadyk Sher-Niyaz is a  director, producer, and public figure from the Kyrgyz Republic, best known for his work on the film Kurmanjan Datka: Queen of the Mountains

Biography
Sadyk Sher-Niyaz was  born on  March 10, 1969, in the village of Chon-Kapka, Talas region, Kyrgyzstan. An ethnic Kyrgyz, Sher-Niyaz is married, the father of three children. At the age of 38 he left Kyrgyzstan to attend High Courses for Scriptwriters and Film Directors in Moscow. His first feature film, Kurmanjan Datka: Queen of the Mountains, was the Kyrgyz submission for Best Foreign Language Film at the 87th Academy Awards.

Sher-Niyaz is the founder of several organizations, including Aitysh Public Fund, "Kalemger" Literary Club, and Film Production Company Aitysh Film.  In 2011, he started the Kyrgyzstan-Land of Short Films.  Later in 2011, Sher-Niyaz became the Chairman of the Union of Cinematographers of Kyrgyzstan; he was re-elected to the position in January 2015.  In 2012, he became one of the founders of the Ak Ilbirs Awards
Later in 2011, Sher-Niyaz became the Chairman of the Union of Cinematographers of Kyrgyzstan, and was again re-elected to the position January 2015.

In late 2014, Sher-Niyaz founded the Asian World Film Festival in Los Angeles, California. According to The Wrap, Sher-Niyaz created the Festival to help other Asian filmmakers in their Oscar campaigns:  ″'I created the Asian World Film Festival to fill a void that I noticed was missing in America. There is a wealth of underrated filmmakers from our region that deserve recognition and this festival was designed to champion and promote them,' festival chairman and creator Sadyk Sher-Niyaz said.″

Education
 2007–2009. - High Courses for Scriptwriters and Film Directors in Moscow (workshop Vladimir Khotinenko, Pavel Finn, Vladimir Fenchenko )
 1994-2000 - Kyrgyz National University (KNU), Department of Law
 1983-1987 - Frunze Engineering College, Technician

Political activity
 2014 Sher Niyaz was nominated to the post of Minister of Culture
 2010 - Minister of Culture and Information of the Kyrgyz Republic
 2005 - Member of the State Commission for the stabilization of the political situation in the Kyrgyz Republic
 2004-2007 – Elected to the Parliament Deputy Ombudsman (Akyikatchy)

Filmography

References

Ethnic Kyrgyz people (individuals)
1969 births
Living people
Kyrgyzstani politicians
Kyrgyz National University alumni
People from Talas Region